The El Paso Subdivision is a railroad line of the BNSF Railway extending  from Belen, New Mexico, to El Paso, Texas. The entire line is dark territory and movements are controlled by Track Warrant Control.

Description
The route begins in Belen at the junction with the Southern Transcon and the south end of the New Mexico Rail Runner Express commuter rail service. The line branches off from the Transcon and heads due south, passing through the communities of La Joya and Socorro, New Mexico, before running along the heavily forested Rio Grande.  south of Belen, the line climbs out of the river valley and through the sparsely vegetated Chihuahuan Desert of south-central New Mexico. The track runs east of the Elephant Butte Reservoir and the resort town of Truth or Consequences, New Mexico before descending a steep grade prior to passing through Rincon, New Mexico. The line then travels past many farms before running through the middle of Las Cruces, New Mexico. The track continues through the Las Cruces and El Paso suburbs before making a sharp turn east and running along the US-Mexico border before arriving in the railroad's El Paso Yard.

Traffic generally consists of grain trains bound to Mexico from Kansas and Nebraska, as well a daily mixed freight train from Belen, and an occasional empty vehicle train. Five times a week, Monday thru Friday, the Rincon Local traverses the line from Rincon to Belen and back again, stopping in Socorro to pick up and set out cars.

External links
BNSF Subdivisions

BNSF Railway lines
Rail infrastructure in New Mexico
Rail infrastructure in Texas